Rosalina Riseu (born 19 September 1972) is an Indonesian retired badminton player who specialized in doubles events. She competed at the 1996 Summer Olympics alongside Flandy Limpele in the mixed doubles event, finished in the quarterfinals after defeated by Chinese pair Liu Jianjun and Sun Man.

Achievements

World Cup 
Mixed doubles

Asian Championships 
Mixed doubles

IBF World Grand Prix 
The World Badminton Grand Prix was sanctioned by the International Badminton Federation from 1983 to 2006.

Mixed doubles

 IBF Grand Prix tournament
 IBF Grand Prix Finals tournament

IBF International 
Women's doubles

Mixed doubles

References

External links 
 
 

1972 births
Living people
Indonesian female badminton players
Badminton players at the 1996 Summer Olympics
Olympic badminton players of Indonesia
20th-century Indonesian women
21st-century Indonesian women